Eltham Football Club is an Australian rules football club in Eltham, Victoria, currently competing in the Northern Football League.

History
The Eltham Football Club began playing social matches at nearby Kangaroo Ground, Diamond Creek and Greensborough from around 1904. Phil McGavin was listed as Secretary in 1904.

In 1907, Police Constable "Ike" Stephens convened a meeting with the idea of providing entertainment for the lads and an outlet for their surplus energy. .

Eltham continued to play social games however World War One saw these stop. After the return of the men in 1918-19, Eltham returned to the football field.

In 1920, the Eltham Football Club joined the Heidelberg District Football League. The team travelled by train to Ivanhoe to play their first game. Home games were played at Eltham Park, now called Eltham Lower Park.

In 1922, Eltham joined other nearby clubs Greensborough, Diamond Creek, Templestowe, Warrandyte, and Kangaroo Ground in establishing the Diamond Valley Football League.

Eltham made their first finals appearance in 1928 and won their first premiership in 1930 by defeating Heidelberg.

In 1930, Eltham Central Park was opened, although this was only used by the footballers for training until 1935, when the club formally moved their home games there and this has been the club's home ever since.

In 1935, Eltham defeated Epping in the Grand Final, but Epping lodged a protest over the eligibility of an Eltham player. A tribunal in Melbourne upheld the protest and ordered a replay. Eltham forfeited the replay and Epping was awarded the premiership.

Eltham left the DVFL to play in VFL Sub Districts League for seasons 1936 & 1937 before returning in 1938.

After five consecutive wooden spoons during the early 1960s, the club went through a golden period of four premierships in six seasons between 1969 and 1974.

Eltham Football Club was relegated to the new DVFL Second Division for Season 1981, but quickly responded with the 1982 premiership and subsequent return to the First Division. This began a trend with Eltham "yo-yoing" between the two divisions – six Second Division premierships and five First Division wooden spoons.

The 2002 Second Division premiership was the Panthers last success. After relegation in 2017 the Panthers went into the season strong favourites and won their first 15 games. On a blustery, raining day the seniors gave up a 3/4 time lead to lose on the siren to Lower Plenty. The reserves, coached by 2017 U/19 Premiership winning coach Tom Snell held on in a tough game to defeat Diamond Creek and only their 5th reserves premiership. 

Season 2020 was called off due to the COVID19 Pandemic.

Premierships

Seniors
(Division One)

 1930 Eltham 7.15.57 defeated Heidelberg 7.8.50 @ Memorial Park, Greensborough
 1932 Eltham 13.19.97 defeated Heidelberg 8.10.58 @ Warringal Park, Heidelberg
 1949 Eltham 8.8.56 defeated Greensborough 7.6.48 @ Warringal Park, Heidelberg
 1953 Eltham 9.16.70 defeated Lakeside Rovers 9.7.61 @ Warringal Park, Heidelberg
 1969 Eltham 16.11.107 defeated Diamond Creek 10.12.72 @ Warringal Park, Heidelberg
 1970 Eltham 14.13.97 defeated Diamond Creek 12.11.83 @ Epping
 1972 Eltham 15.19.109 defeated Reservoir Lakeside 11.11.77 @ Warringal Park, Heidelberg
 1974 Eltham 10.9.69 defeated Heidelberg 9.8.62 @ Warringal Park, Heidelberg

(Division Two)
 1982 Eltham 15.13.103 defeated Macleod Rosanna 14.8.92 @ Nillimbik Park, Diamond Creek
 1989 Eltham 18.11.119 defeated Epping 17.8.110 @ Warringal Park, Heidelberg
 1995 Eltham 10.14.74 defeated West Preston 10.10.70 @ Warringal Park, Heidelberg
 1997 Eltham 13.9.87 defeated Mernda 7.13.55 @ Warringal Park, Heidelberg
 2000 Eltham 12.8.80 defeated Watsonia 8.6.54 @ Shelly St, North Heidelberg
 2002 Eltham 12.9.81 defeated Mernda 7.17.59 @ Whittlesea Showgrounds, Whittlesea

Reserves
(Division One)
 1947 Eltham 3.6.24 defeated Diamond Creek 3.5.23 @ Warringal Park, Heidelberg
 1971 Eltham 11.11.77 defeated Greensborough 10.8.68 @ Warringal Park, Heidelberg
 1974 Eltham 10.13.73 defeated Templestowe 5.5.35 @ Warringal Park, Heidelberg

(Division Two)
 2000 Eltham 13.16.94 defeated Macleod 7.12.54 @ Shelley Street Reserve, North Heidelberg
 2018 Eltham 7.12.54 defeated Diamond Creek 5.8.38 @ Preston City Oval, Preston
 2021 No final series due to Covid Pandemic. Awarded Minor Premiership 
 2022 Eltham 16.13.109 defeated Diamond Creek 3.8.26 @ Preston City Oval, Preston

Under 19
(Division One)
 2007 Eltham 16.13.109 defeated Northcote Park 10.7.67 @ Preston City Oval
 2017 Eltham 7.14.56 defeated Greensborough Football Club 7.10.52 @ Preston City Oval
 2019 Eltham 13.10.88 defeated St Mary's Senior Football Club 11.14.80 @ Preston City Oval

Honourboard

Other highlights: 
 Most no. 'A' Grade games at Eltham Football Club Harry Barrett (dec.) (263)
 Most no. Open Age games at Eltham Football Club David Brown 308
 Most no. 'A' Grade games as a player/umpire Eddie Mapperson (843).
 Winner of VFL / AFL Brownlow Medal Peter Moore 1979, 1984

AFL / VFL footballers from Eltham Football Club 
 Nick Coffield – Current St Kilda Footballer
 Patrick Lipinski – Current Collingwood Footballer
 Lauren Brazzale – Current AFLW Carlton Footballer
 Marcus Bontempelli – Current Western Bulldogs Footballer
 Josh Caddy – Former Richmond Footballer
 David Zaharakis – Former Essendon Footballer
 Nick Vlastuin – Current Richmond Footballer
 Daniel Currie – Former Sydney Swans  North Melbourne and Gold Coast Suns
 Adam Simpson – North Melbourne. Captain 2004 -09, Premiership's 1996 & 1999. Currently Coach of West Coast Eagles Football Club  
 Andrew Dale – Melbourne in 1980s
 Matthew Ryan - Collingwood, Sydney, Brisbane
 Stephen Easton – North Melbourne & Carlton in late 1970s, early 1980s
 Darren McLaine – Collingwood in 1980s
 Alexander "Sandy" Hyslop – Collingwood in 1980s
 Peter Moore – Collingwood & Melbourne & dual Brownlow Medallist, AFL and Collingwood Hall of Fame 
 John Caulfield - Richmond 1963
 Tom Butherway - Fitzroy 1937
 Jack Twyford - South Melbourne, Richmond (1932 Premiership side) & Collingwood
 Don Fraser - Richmond 1920s

External links

 Official club website
 Northern Football League
 Footypedia

Northern Football League (Australia) clubs
Australian rules football clubs established in 1909
1909 establishments in Australia
Sport in the Shire of Nillumbik
Australian rules football clubs in Melbourne